Boddhiya Baduge Dilan Priyanjan Anslam Perera, MP (born 19 April 1962) (known as Dilan Perera) is a Sri Lankan politician. Current Member of Parliament for Badulla District, he was the former State Minister of Highways, State Minister of Housing and Samurdhi, Non-Cabinet Minister of Port Development, and Deputy Minister of Justice.

Early life and education
Born to Marshal Perera, PC and Daya Perera, he was educated at Royal College Colombo and studied at the Sri Lanka Law College.

Political career
Perera entered politics in 1988, when he was elected to the Uva Provincial Council and served as leader of the opposition from 1993 to 1994. He was elected to parliament in the 1994 parliamentary elections and was served as Deputy Minister of Justice, Constitutional Affairs, Ethnic Affairs and National Integration between 1999 and 2000. Having been re-elected or appointed to parliament from the national list, Perera had served as Deputy Minister of Ports and Aviation, Deputy Minister of Media and Communication, Cabinet Minister of Estate Infrastructure, Minister of Ports and Ports Development, Minister of Foreign Employment Promotion and Welfare and State Minister of Highways.

Controversies
In February 1997, he was involved in a shooting with political rivals in which parliamentarian Nalanda Ellawala was killed. In September 2018, he was accused of being linked to a person arrested in Milan for human smuggling, a link he strongly denied. That same month, he publicly admitted that some of the LTTE soldiers and civilians who surrendered in the Sri Lankan Civil War had been killed by Armed forces.

Family
Perera was married to Saroja Sirisena, who served as Sri Lankan Ambassador to Germany and High Commissioner to the United Kingdom.

References

External links 
Biography on Parliament's website

Government ministers of Sri Lanka
Sinhalese lawyers
Sri Lankan Buddhists
Alumni of Royal College, Colombo
Members of the 10th Parliament of Sri Lanka
Members of the 11th Parliament of Sri Lanka
Members of the 12th Parliament of Sri Lanka
Members of the 13th Parliament of Sri Lanka
Members of the 14th Parliament of Sri Lanka
Members of the 15th Parliament of Sri Lanka
Members of the 16th Parliament of Sri Lanka
Living people
1962 births
People from Badulla